Richard Leo Carroll (April 28, 1885 – January 20, 1952) was a Canadian ice hockey coach. He led the Toronto team in the National Hockey League to the Stanley Cup championship in 1918 and the Toronto Canoe Club junior hockey team to the Memorial Cup win in 1920.

Biography
From Guelph, Ontario, Carroll worked with the Toronto Blueshirts of the National Hockey Association.  He won the Stanley Cup with his brother Frank as a trainer in 1914. In December, 1917 Richard was then asked by Charlie Querrie to be coach and assistant manager of the new Toronto NHL franchise. The team won the Stanley Cup in its first year, but even with largely the same lineup, struggled badly in 1918–19 (now under the name the Toronto Arenas), finishing with five wins and 13 losses. Carroll was replaced as coach after that season.

In 1919–20, Carroll coached the Toronto Dental Society senior team in the Ontario Hockey Association and the Toronto Canoe Club junior team that won the 1920 Memorial Cup. In 1920–21 and 1921–22, he coached the Toronto Aura Lee senior team.

Caroll then coached the Pittsburgh Yellow Jackets of the United States Amateur Hockey Association, leading them to two championships in 1924 and 1925. He then coached the Duluth Hornets of the American Hockey Association for two seasons (1926 to 1928) and the Tulsa Oilers for three seasons (1928 to 1931). Over his first five years as a coach in the AHA, Carroll's teams finished in first place four times. Staying in the AHA, Carroll coached the St. Louis Flyers (1931–32) and the Oklahoma City Warriors (1933–34), but both teams had losing records.

He was also a football and boxing coach, and was manager of the Guelph Maple Leafs baseball team of the Intercounty Baseball League, winning the league championship in 1928.

Caroll died in Guelph after being confined to hospital with a heart condition. He was 66 years old.

Coaching record

References

External links
 Professional hockey coaching statistics at hockeydb.com

1885 births
1952 deaths
Canadian ice hockey coaches
Ice hockey people from Ontario
Toronto Maple Leafs coaches
Sportspeople from Guelph
Stanley Cup champions